The Year of the Intern, the first novel by Robin Cook and very different from his thrillers, follows the journey of intern Dr. Peters through his year of placement.

Plot introduction
It is an insider's perspective of the medical world. As Dr. Peters becomes a doctor he is destroying himself as a person due to extensive work and concerns.

Dr. Cook began writing the book while serving on a submarine, basing it on his experiences as a medical resident. When it did not do particularly well, he began an extensive study of other books in the genre to see what made a bestseller. He decided to concentrate on medical suspense thrillers, mixing intricately plotted murder and intrigue with medical technology. He also brought controversial ethical and social issues affecting the medical profession to the attention of the general public.

Plot Summary 
Dr. Peters receives a phone call from a nurse, who sounds desperate, but Dr. Peters can do little. He has forgotten when he last slept, but he knows that in the coming hours he will make life or death decisions. As he begins his internship, he must deal with assisting the surgeons in the operating room, help nurses who happen to know more than him, cope with worried friends and family of the ill and injured, and pretend that he is a qualified doctor. The book takes a deeper look into the psychical and psychological effects on a medical intern.

External links
The Publisher's site

1973 American novels
Novels by Robin Cook
Harcourt (publisher) books
1973 debut novels